Snowie Pang (born 26 August 1977) is a Hong Kong swimmer. She competed in the women's 100 metre breaststroke event at the 1996 Summer Olympics.

References

External links
 

1977 births
Living people
Hong Kong female breaststroke swimmers
Olympic swimmers of Hong Kong
Swimmers at the 1996 Summer Olympics
Place of birth missing (living people)